The 1876 Alabama gubernatorial election took place on August 7, 1876, in order to elect the governor of Alabama. Incumbent Democrat George S. Houston ran for reelection to a second term.

Results

References

1876
gubernatorial
Alabama
August 1876 events